The 2018–19 Pro50 Championship was the seventeenth edition of the Pro50 Championship, a List A cricket tournament that was played in Zimbabwe, which started on 8 December 2018. The tournament featured four teams, instead of the five that took part in the previous edition, with the Rising Stars being disbanded. The other change to the 2018–19 tournament was that it was played across six rounds, instead of ten, as per previous years. The Rising Stars were the defending champions.

The Mashonaland Eagles were the first team to qualify for the final of the tournament. They were joined in the final by the Matabeleland Tuskers, after they won their penultimate fixture by eight wickets. Mashonaland Eagles won the tournament, beating Matabeleland Tuskers by two wickets in the final.

Points table

 Advanced to the final

Fixtures

Round-robin

Final

References

External links
 Series home at ESPN Cricinfo

2018 in Zimbabwean cricket
2019 in Zimbabwean cricket
Pro50 Championship